Russian Lullabies, now out of print, is an album by Havalina Rail Co. released on Matt Wignall's own record label Jackson Rubio.

Track listing
 "Tundra"  – 3:46
 "Kaliningrad"  – 2:35
 "Twilight Time"  – 4:36
 "Siberian Safari"  – 2:53
 "Red and Blue (In St. Petersburgh)"  – 5:51
 "Traffic in Moscow"  – 1:04
 "Changes and Forms"  – 4:33
 "The Lovesick Blues of a Young Soviet Proletariat"  – 2:19
 "Before Ararat"  – 2:17
 "Winter"  – 1:58
 "Total Depravity"  – 4:44
 "The Sensual Song"  – 4:53
 "Nathan's Song"  – 2:04
 "Russian Lullaby"  – 4:49
 "Rivers of Russia"  – 7:08

External links
Download Russian Lullabies on the Havalina Website 

Albums free for download by copyright owner
1999 albums
Havalina albums